Conmáel, son of Éber Finn, according to medieval Irish legend and historical traditions, became High King of Ireland when he killed Ethriel, son of Íriel Fáid, in the Battle of Rairiu. He was the first Milesian High King to have been born in Ireland, and the first to have been based in Munster. He fought twenty-five battles against the descendants of Érimón, and ruled for thirty years, until he was killed by Tigernmas in the Battle of Óenach Macha. The Eóganachta are said to be his descendants. The Lebor Gabála Érenn synchronises his reign with the deaths of Samson in ancient Israel, and Fleuthius, king of Assyria. Geoffrey Keating dates his reign from 1239–1209 BC, the Annals of the Four Masters from 1651 to 1621 BC BC.

Notes

Legendary High Kings of Ireland
Regicides
Monarchs killed in action